Teresina Marsico (born 7 February 1976) is an Italian former footballer who played as a centre forward for Lazio.

References

Bibliography

Luca Barboni and Gabriele Cecchi, Annuario del calcio femminile 2002/2003, Agnano Pisano (PI), Etruria Football Club - Stamperia Editoriale Pisana S.r.l., luglio 2003.
Salvatore Lo Presti, Almanacco del calcio mondiale 2004-05, Torino, S.E.T., 2004.
Sergio Nunzio Capizzi e Roberto Quartarone, Il cielo è rosa sopra il Cibali, Catania, Quelli del '46, 2020, .
Roberto Quartarone e Sergio Nunzio Capizzi, Calcio femminile Gravina, la Stella del Sud, Catania, Quelli del '46, 2021, .

1976 births
A.S.D. Reggiana Calcio Femminile players
ACF Milan players
S.S. Lazio Women 2015 players
Italian women's footballers
Italy women's international footballers
Women's association football forwards
Living people